Nicholas William Gross (born July 19, 1988) is an American entrepreneur, musician and founder of the Find Your Grind education platform. Gross founded the band girlfriends together with Travis Mills in 2020. He is also a member of Goldfinger.

Early life 
Gross grew up in Laguna Beach, California, the only son of Bill H. Gross and his second wife Sue, and began playing the drums around age seven. He started a career as a drummer and in subsequent years was the drummer for bands Open Air Stereo and Half the Animal. With Open Air Stereo Gross took part in the reality show Laguna Beach: The Real Orange County. The band later signed with Epic Records.

In 2009, Gross launched STRZ Enterprises, a record studio and record label.

Career

Big Noise 
In 2018, Gross founded the music group Big Noise together with ex-Vagrant executive Jon Cohen and rock producer John Feldmann. He is CEO of Big Noise. As of 2019 the label's roster included Ashley Tisdale and New Politics. Also in 2018, Gross founded Gross Labs as parent company of Find Your Grind and Big Noise, among others.

In 2019, Big Noise launched the Noise Nest, a 5000-sq. ft recording studio in Los Angeles and launched the FYG U Music + Tech Festival.

In June 2019, Big Noise acquired the hip hop label Commission Record. Its roster includes MadeinTYO, Lil Dicky, Derez De'Shon and DJ Envy. The same year The Used and Travis Tritt signed with Big Noise.

By 2021 Big Noise had expanded their 10,000 sq ft. recording studio facility The Noise Nest with five recording studios and rooms for streaming and gaming. Alongside the signed artists from Big Noise other clients like Post Malone, DaBaby and A$AP Rocky use the facilities for work.

Mod Sun signed a long-term deal with Big Noise in March 2021, and has since released his 2021 album Internet Killed the Rockstar with the label. His upcoming album God Save the Teen will also be released using Big Noise.

In March 2022, The Veronicas signed with Big Noise.

Goldfinger and girlfriends 
Since 2018 Gross had been touring drummer for Goldfinger. Two years later he became the official drummer of the band.

In 2020, Gross formed the band girlfriends with Travis Mills, with the duo citing Blink-182, 5 Seconds of Summer and All Time Low as the band's musical influences. The band released the first single "California" on June 26, 2020, with the music video being released on August 11. This was followed by their second single "Eyes Wide Shut" on 21 August 2020. Their self-titled debut album was released on 23 October 2020 featuring 14 tracks. The production led by John Feldmann was a success with almost 20 songs being written in a few months.

Esports 
In 2018, FYG partnered with esports platform ReKTGlobal, parent company of Rogue and London Royal Ravens, in scholarships for students who want to pursue esports. In 2019 Gross led a series A funding of $10.8 million for ReKTGlobal. He became a member of the board and the lead investor in ReKTGlobal.

Personal life 
Gross is married to Natasha Gross (born Natasha Barritt), the Executive Director of the Find Your Grind Foundation. They have one child together. Gross enjoys surfing, running and skating.

References

External links 

 Find Your Grind
 Gross Labs
 Big Noise

Living people
People from Laguna Beach, California
American drummers
American investors
1988 births